Ambo University is a national university in Ambo, Oromia Region, Ethiopia. The Ministry of Education admits qualified students to Ambo University based on their score on the Ethiopian Higher Education Entrance Examination (EHEEE). Ambo University was established on 11 May 2011 by government proclamation (Council of Ministers 212/2011).

History
Ambo University is founded on 11 May 2011 by government proclamation (Council of Ministers 212/2011).  It is non-profit public higher education institution. The university is recognized by the Ministry of Education as coeducational Ethiopian higher education institution. Originally the university's foundation traced back in 1947, becoming the oldest higher educational institution where basic education began by constructing building by few French engineers. Languages taught at that period limited to Amharic, Mathematics, French, etc, and there were four Ethiopian and four French teachers.

Ambo envisaged to surpass academics, research and community services qualification to accede higher education standard. Ambo currently has 75 graduate, 71 undergraduate programs, 10 PhD programs and 4 speciality programs with nine colleges/institutes/schools and academic departments. In addition, Ambo expanded its branch to Awaro, Guder and Waliso.

References

Universities and colleges in Ethiopia
Oromia Region